Brendan McCurdy is an American television actor. He was born in Glendale, Arizona on June 28, 1984. His big break was when he appeared in the 1993 ABC-TV movie They've Taken Our Children: The Chowchilla Kidnapping (shown in the UK as Vanished Without a Trace) starring Karl Malden, which is sometimes shown on the Biography Channel. This was a dramatization of the 1976 bus kidnapping in Chowchilla, California.

He also appeared in stage production and television commercials.

Filmography

External links

American male television actors
Male actors from Arizona
1984 births
Living people
People from Glendale, Arizona